James Batemon III (born April 8, 1997) is an American professional basketball player for the Crailsheim Merlins of the German Basketball Bundesliga. He played college basketball with North Dakota State College of Science and Loyola Marymount. Following his college career, Batemon played professionally in Europe. In 2022, he was named the LNB Pro B Most Valuable Player.

High school career
Batemon attended Riverside University High School in Milwaukee, Wisconsin.

College career
Batemon played two seasons of college basketball with North Dakota State College of Science from 2015 to 2017 before transferring to Loyola Marymount where he played until 2019. Batemon made an immediate impact on the program in his two seasons after transferring to LMU from an All-American career at North Dakota College of Science. As a junior, Batemon ranked fourth in the WCC in scoring, and led all newcomers to the conference, with a 17.8 ppg average in his All-WCC Second Team season and WCC All-Tournament Team. In his senior campaign, Batemon tied the program record by starting and playing all 34 games, finishing with the third-most minutes played in a season in school history at 1201. His senior year was filled with accolades after leading the West Coast Conference with 54 steals as he was named to the All-WCC First Team, Lou Henson Award Watch List, and Jamaica Classic Montego Bay Division MVP. Finished his career tied for 13th at 17.0 career ppg, 15th in career free throws made (323), 16th in career assists (261), and third in career minutes averaged (25.2).

Professional career
After going undrafted at the 2019 NBA Draft, Batemon started his pro career with Ogre of the Latvian-Estonian League. For the 2020–2021 season, Batemon joined JA Vichy-Clermont of the LNB Pro B. The following season he signed with Tours Métropole Basket. After the season he was named the LNB Pro B Most Valuable Player.

On August 10, 2022, Batemon moved to ASK Karditsas of the Greek Basket League. On 15 October 2022, he scored a buzzer beater from half-court to give Karditsa a 59–57 win against Kolossos Rodou On January 11, 2023, his contract was bought out by German club Crailsheim Merlins.

References

External links
Proballers Profile
RealGM Profile
Eurobasket.com Profile

Living people
1997 births
American expatriate basketball people in France
American expatriate basketball people in Germany
American expatriate basketball people in Greece
American expatriate basketball people in Latvia
ASK Karditsas B.C. players
Loyola Marymount Lions men's basketball players
Point guards
American men's basketball players
Basketball players from Milwaukee